Krister Classon (born 17 December 1955 in Kalv, Västergötland, Sweden) is a Swedish comedian, actor, director and screenwriter. He is best known for being a part of the Swedish comedian duo Stefan & Krister, along with Stefan Gerhardsson. Together, they created several successful TV-shows and farces, which Classon wrote and sometimes even directed, while he had one of the leading roles.

References 

1955 births
Living people
Swedish male actors
Swedish comedians